So You Think You Can Dance is an American dance competition reality show, which returned for its seventeenth season on May 18, 2022.

A 17th season of So You Think You Can Dance had originally been set to air in the summer of 2020, with a judging panel composed of series creator Nigel Lythgoe (his seventeenth consecutive season as judge), Mary Murphy and Laurieann Gibson. However, in June 2020 the show was postponed indefinitely due to the COVID-19 pandemic. The season was finally produced in the summer of 2022, now with an entirely different set of judges: freestyle hip-hop dancer Stephen "tWitch" Boss, who had been a Season 4 runner-up and Season 15 judge; entertainer and YouTube celebrity JoJo Siwa; and actor Matthew Morrison. Cat Deeley returned to her role as host for a sixteenth consecutive season.

In May 2022, Morrison was fired from the show, after having sent direct messages on social media to a female contestant that were deemed by producers to be inappropriate. He was replaced by actress Leah Remini, starting with the season's fifth episode.

On August 10, 2022, Alexis Warr was crowned "America's Favorite Dancer", making her the first ballroom dancer to win the show. (While Season 2 winner Benji Schwimmer was also a partner dancer, his specialty, West Coast Swing, is generally not considered a ballroom dance).

This was the final season to feature Stephen "tWitch" Boss, prior to his death in December 2022.

Auditions 
Initial auditions, for dancers ages 18 to 30, were due to begin in March 2020 but were postponed amid in the beginning of COVID-19 pandemic. Auditions would likely be continued for this season during the delay. Those who were originally submitted in 2020 and could be getting an extended age limit to 32. Production was rescheduled for March 2022 including the start of auditions.

Choreography Round 
This season, the Callbacks/Academy Round was renamed the Choreography Round and took place over the course of one day, as opposed to one week like past seasons. The Choreography Round consisted of three rounds led by creative producer/choreographer, Mandy Moore. The first round had the contestants dancing in their own style, the second round focused on partner work and the third round was a group routine. 42 contestants made it to the choreography round and contestants were eliminated after each round until 12 remained to advance to the studio shows.

Contestants

Top 12 Contestants

Female contestants

Male contestants

Elimination chart 

Contestants are listed in chronological order of elimination.

Studio shows 
Once again, the Bottom 2 vote-getters of each gender will face elimination & the judges vote, with one male & one female leaving each round. However, for the first time this series only the studio audience can vote for which dancer should stay in the competition.

Top 12 Perform Part 1 – The Dancers Dozen (June 15, 2022) 

 Group Routine: Top 12: "Bussin" – Nicki Minaj & Lil Baby (Hip Hop; Choreographer: Luther Brown)

In this round, each pair danced a routine in the Main Style of the Male Partner. This is the 300th episode of the show. No elimination took place this week.

Top 12 Perform Part 2 – Girl's Night Out (June 22, 2022) 
 Group Routine: Top 12: "Aura" – Lady Gaga (Pop-Jazz; Choreographer: Brian Friedman)

Each pair will now dance the main style of the Female Partner. Two dancers (one guy & one girl) will go home at the end of the show

Top 10 Perform – Around the World (June 29, 2022) 
This week, the Top 10 were assigned new partners & danced styles originating from different countries around the world

Top 8 Perform – Turn Back Time (July 13, 2022) 
The dancers were once again given new partners & performed a routine inspired by a previous decade, as well as a solo in their own style

Duets

Solos

Top 6 Perform – Starry Starry Night (July 20, 2022) 
 Group Routine: Top 6 & All-Stars: "The Chain" – Fleetwood Mac (Contemporary; Choreographers: Mandy Korpinen & Elizabeth Petrin)

Since the judges could not reach a decision, no contestant was eliminated this week.

Top 6 Perform Part 2 – Head 2 Head (July 27, 2022) 

 Trios:
 Top 3 Girls: "Woman" – Doja Cat (Hip-hop; Choreographer: Mel Charlot)
 Top 3 Boys: "Mr. Pinstripe Suit" – Big Bad Voodoo Daddy (Broadway; Choreographer: Dominique Kelley)
 Carter, Ralyn, & Beau: "Please Turn Green" – Teddy Swims (Contemporary; Choreographer: Chase Haley Bowden)
 Alexis, Essence, & Keaton: "Why Don't You Do Right?" – Julie London (Jazz; Choreographer: Jonathan Redavid)

Head to Head Solos 
New to the series, each dancer was paired against each other in a head to head dance off. The loser of each pair is eliminated. There were no judge's saves this week.

Round 1

Round 2

Round 3

Top 3 Perform – The Final Cut (August 3, 2022) 
Each dancer performed a duet with their fellow contestants as well as a duet in their own style with an All Star.

The Season 17 Finale (August 10, 2022) 
Each of the finalists performed four times: a duet with a fellow Top 12 finalist of their choice, a duet outside of their style with an All Star, a solo and in a duet with each other.

 Group Routine: Top 12 & Judges: "Instruction (feat. Demi Lovato & Stefflon Don)" — Jax Jones (Pop-Jazz; Choreographer: Brian Friedman)

Solos

Ratings

U.S. Nielsen ratings

References

External links 

2022 American television seasons
Season 17
Television productions postponed due to the COVID-19 pandemic